The 1965 Wimbledon Championships took place on the outdoor grass courts at the All England Lawn Tennis and Croquet Club in Wimbledon, London, United Kingdom. The tournament was held from Monday 21 June until Saturday 3 July 1965. It was the 79th staging of the Wimbledon Championships, and the third Grand Slam tennis event of 1965. Roy Emerson and Margaret Smith won the singles titles.

Champions

Seniors

Men's singles

 Roy Emerson defeated  Fred Stolle, 6–2, 6–4, 6–4

Women's singles

 Margaret Smith defeated  Maria Bueno, 6–4, 7–5

Men's doubles

 John Newcombe /  Tony Roche defeated  Ken Fletcher /  Bob Hewitt, 7–5, 6–3, 6–4

Women's doubles

 Maria Bueno /  Billie Jean King defeated  Françoise Dürr /  Janine Lieffrig, 6–2, 7–5

Mixed doubles

 Ken Fletcher /  Margaret Smith defeated  Tony Roche /  Judy Tegart, 12–10, 6–3

Juniors

Boys' singles

 Vladimir Korotkov defeated  Georges Goven, 6–2, 3–6, 6–3

Girls' singles

 Olga Morozova defeated  Raquel Giscafré, 6–3, 6–3

References

External links
 Official Wimbledon Championships website

 
Wimbledon Championships
Wimbledon Championships
Wimbledon Championships
Wimbledon Championships